"Amagi-goe" (天城越え Walk Over Amagi Pass) is the 45th single by Japanese singer Sayuri Ishikawa.  The song is written by Osamu Yoshioka as lyricist, Tetsuya Gen (弦哲也) as composer and Nobuyuki Sakuraba (桜庭伸幸) as arranger.  The single was released on July 21, 1986, by Nippon Columbia.  The sleeve does not have the time of the song.

Together with "Tsugaru Kaikyo Fuyu-geshiki", the song is Ishikawa's most popular from her career.  By the song, Ishikawa was nominated for the 28th Nippon Record Taisho Award (Japan Record Award 日本レコード大賞) in 1986 but she did not win the award.  As of 2020, Ishikawa has sung Amagi-goe twelve times at the annual NHK Kōhaku Uta Gassen.

There is a monument commemorating the song in front of the Jōren Falls in Amagi, Shizuoka Prefecture.

The song is not directly linked to the novella of the same title by Seichō Matsumoto nor to the movie of the same title based on the novella, which was released in 1983.

Other versions 
Ishikawa has re-recorded Amagi-goe for her remix album Shunka (春夏) released in 1999 by Pony Canyon.  This version is also included in the 40th anniversary box set released by Teichiku in 2012.  Time of this version is 4:56.

Marty Friedman produced a Rock (heavy metal) version of the song, and played it with Ishikawa on TV.

Yumi Uchiyama and Inori Minase (both in character) sung versions of the song, and are included in the original soundtrack compilations of Binbougami ga (under the title "Crossing Amagi") and Masamune-kun's Revenge (as an insert song in Episode 12) respectively.

B-side 
The B-side song "Kakurenbo" (隠れんぼ Hide and Seek) is written by Osamu Yoshioka as lyricist, Tetsuya Gen as composer and Nobuyuki Sakuraba as arranger.  The sleeve does not have the time of the song.  Ishikawa's debut song bears the same title, but is a different song.

Album appearance 
Amagi-goe is included in Ishikawa's studio album of the same title.  The B-side song Kakurenbo is not included in any of her studio albums.

Credits and personnel 
Tatsuo Watanabe (渡辺達生) is credited as photographer for the cover.  The sleeve credits the disk as produced by Hori Music (ホリ・ミュージック).

Notes 

1986 singles
Japanese-language songs
1986 songs
Sayuri Ishikawa songs